Fishback is a surname. Notable people with the surname include: 

Dan Fishback (born 1981), American performance artist, playwright and singer-songwriter
Dominique Fishback (born 1991), American actor and playwright
Fred Fishback (later credited as Fred Hibbard, 1894–1925), film director, screenwriter and producer of the silent era
Ian Fishback, US Army officer, who wrote to Senator John McCain about the abuse of prisoners
Jeff Fishback (born 1941), American middle- and long-distance runner
Joe Fishback (born 1967), football player
Kurt Edward Fishback, American portrait photographer
Margaret Fishback (1900–1985), American poet and prose author
Price V. Fishback, economic historian
William Meade Fishback (1831–1903), 17th Governor of Arkansas, US

See also
Fischbach
Fischbachau
Fischbacher
Fischbeck